The Faroe Islands Premier League kvinnur (also known as Betri Deildin kvinnur for sponsorship reasons) is the top level women's football league of the Faroe Islands. It was called 1. deild kvinnur until 2018, when the Faroese top tier in the women's football for the first time was named after a sponsor. The new name was Betri Deildin kvinnur and is a deal for five years, from 2018 until the end of the 2022 season.

It is organized by the Faroe Islands Football Association and it was first played in 1985. The winners qualify for the UEFA Women's Champions League.

History
The league was played for the first time in 1985. In its early years and throughout the 1990s, it was dominated by the Tórshavn teams, with HB winning it seven times and B36 four; other teams to be crowned champions in the period were Skála, two times, and ÍF, once. KÍ also won their first title during the successful period of the Tórshavn duo.

The KÍ era
KÍ dominated the league from 2000, winning it seventeen times in a row, establishing a new world record for consecutive championships won.

The dominance was so big that in an interview in 2005, after winning the league for the sixth consecutive season, KÍ midfielder Malena Josephsen stated: "We know when we go on the pitch that we will win the match, the only question is [by] how much we will win. We are not getting any better by playing in this league."

A new champion and sponsorship deal
After being runners-up four consecutive times, EB/Streymur/Skála ended KÍ's winning streak in 2017, becoming only the second club to represent the Faroe Islands in the UEFA Women's Champions League, and defended their title in 2018.

For the 2018 season, the league gained its first sponsorship deal, when the FSF announced that Betri, a bank and insurance company headquartered in Tórshavn, would sponsor the men's and women's leagues, thus changing 1. deild kvinnur's name to Betri deildin kvinnur. The second best division was then given the name 1. deild kvinnur.

Format
In 2020 the league will be contested by six teams, playing each other four times for a total of 20 rounds. A second division exists, but there is no promotion and relegation between the two divisions.

Current teams

In 2020 the league will be contested by six teams, the same as in 2018, one team more from last season's five, as the women's team from the club NSÍ from Runavík entered the league.

List of seasons

Titles by club

Clubs in bold are currently playing in the league.
Clubs in italics are competing in cooperation with another club or inactive in women's football.

References

External links
 League at UEFA
 Faroese women's league on Soccerway.com

 
Far
1
Women
Women's sports leagues in the Faroe Islands